Christine Siddoway is an American Antarctic researcher, best known for her work on the geology and tectonics of the Ford Ranges in western Marie Byrd Land. Other discoveries relate to preserved records of continental-interior sedimentation during the Sturtian glaciation, Cryogenian Period, in Rodinia, and evidence of a reduced Pliocene extent of the West Antarctic ice sheet, based upon investigation of clasts transported to/deposited in deep water by Ice rafting in the Amundsen Sea.

Early life and education
Siddoway completed her undergraduate education at Carleton College in 1984. Siddoway received a master's degree in 1987 from the University of Arizona, then attended the University of California, Santa Barbara where she earned her Ph.D in 1995. Her dissertation focused on the only known gneiss dome in Antarctica, in the Fosdick Mountains, Marie Byrd Land. As graduate student, she began the first of a series of studies in the Fosdick Metamorphic Complex in Marie Byrd Land with her PhD advisor and project principal investigator Bruce Luyendyk.

Career and impact
Siddoway's career includes 11 field research seasons in Antarctica since 1989, plus additional funded laboratory projects. The central issue was when and how mid crustal rocks found in the Fosdick Metamorphic Complex became exhumed. Her work demonstrated a role for doming, anatexis, and intrusion, within a regional context of right lateral strike slip—leading to a model of rapid exhumation via transtension rather than orthogonal extension as in a core complex. That had been the working model but it proved to be incorrect when a detachment fault of a core complex was later found. She continued to refine the fundamentals of the process of gneiss dome emplacement authoring a special publication on that topic with the Fosdick range as a type model.  An outgrowth of the early work explored the Fosdick Mountains gneiss dome as a repository of information about crustal differentiation leading to stabilization of the landmass of Marie Byrd Land within the Antarctic continent.

Siddoway co-founded the ANTscape project in 2009  which stimulated research in the reconstruction of bedrock topography of Antarctica for key intervals of the geologic past—an important parameter for understanding the origins and evolution of the Antarctic ice sheet.

Siddoway's Antarctic work has been funded by the U.S. National Science Foundation, with nine NSF grants received over 22 years. The recent ROSETTA-Ice Project was a collaboration with co-investigators from Columbia University, UC San Diego, and Earth Space Research, with a prevalence of women PIs, to study the framework of the Ross Ice Shelf and Ross Embayment, ROSETTA-ice. The project used airborne geophysics and on-ground investigations and was funded by the National Science Foundation and the Moore Foundation.

Along with her work in Antarctica, Siddoway has pursued research in the Front Range of the Colorado Rocky Mountains. This work led to a surprising result for the age of Cryogenian sandstone dikes within granite host rock, a matter that had been unresolved for more than 125 years. The Tavakaiv quartzite formation contributes to new appreciation of the time of formation  of The Great Unconformity in Colorado.

She is currently working on Ice sheet erosional Interaction with Hot Geotherm, ICI-Hot in West Antarctica, International Ocean Discovery Program (IODP) 379, 2019-2021 Amundsen Sea – West Antarctic Ice Sheet History, Cryogenian intracontinental sedimentary records for Rodinia, and Testing the linchpin of WAIS collapse with diatoms and ice rafted debris in Pleistocene and Late Pliocene strata of the Resolution Drift.  A recently completed project is Collaborative Research: A systems approach to understanding the Ross Ocean and ice Shelf Environment, and Tectonic setting through Aerogeophysical surveys and modeling, or ROSETTA-ICE.

Siddoway has served on committees of the Geological Society of America, including as Associate Editor for the GSA Bulletin. She has also served twice on the Organizing Committee for the International Symposium on Antarctic Earth Sciences (1995, 2007) and on the Transantarctic Mountain Science Planning Committee (2015).

Awards and honors
Siddoway was elected a Fellow of the Geological Society of America in 2009 and received the Antarctica Service Medal in 2003. She was awarded a Fulbright Post-doctoral Research Fellowship in Italy in 1995.

Selected works 
Siddoway, C.S., 2021, Geology of West Antarctica (Chapter 3, pp. 87–131), in Geology of the Antarctic Continent; Stuttgart: Schweizerbart Science Publishers, ISBN 978-3-443-11034-5. 
Siddoway, C.S., 2020, Antarctica, in Encyclopedia of Geology, 2nd edition, Amsterdam: Academic Press, doi:10.1016/B978-0-08-102908-4.00136-3. 
Jordan, T.A., Riley, T.R. and Siddoway, C., 2020, Geology of West Antarctica, Nature Reviews Earth and Environment,  doi:10.1038/s43017-019-0013-6, https://rdcu.be/b0OL8 .
Flowers, R. M., Macdonald, FA., Siddoway, C.S., and Havranek, R., 2020, Diachronous development of the Great Unconformity prior to Snowball Earth, Proceedings of the National Academy of Sciences, doi: 10.1073/pnas.1913131117.
Siddoway, C., Palladino, G., Prosser, G., Freedman, D., and Duckworth, W. C., 2019, Basement-hosted sand injectites: Use of field examples to advance understanding of hydrocarbon reservoirs in fractured basement rocks, in Bowman, M. (ed.), Subsurface Sand Remobilization and Injection, Geol. Society of London Special Publication 493, doi: 10.1144/SP493-2018-140.
Tinto, K. J., Padman, L., Siddoway, C.S., and 15 others, 2019, Ross Ice Shelf response to climate driven by the tectonic imprint on seafloor bathymetry, Nature Geoscience, 12,  441–449, DOI: 10.1038/s41561-019-0370-2. 
Colleoni, F., De Santis, L., Siddoway, C.S., Bergamasco, A., Golledge, N., Lohmann, G., Passchier, S. and Siegert, M., 2018, Spatio-temporal variability of processes across Antarctic ice-bed-ocean interfaces, Nature Communications, v. 9, 2289, DOI:10.1038/s41467-018-04583-0, https://rdcu.be/ZLBl  .
Jensen, J.L,. Siddoway, C. S., Reiners, P.W., Ault, A.K., Thomson, S.N.  and Steele-MacInnis, M., 2018, Single-crystal hematite (U-Th)/He dates and fluid inclusions document widespread Cryogenian sand injection in crystalline basement, Earth and Planetary Science Letters, v. 500, 145–155, DOI:10.1016/j.epsl.2018.08.021
 Siddoway, C.S., 2010 "Microplate motion" Nature Geoscience: 3(4),pp. 225–226. DOI:10.1038/ngeo835.
 Siddoway, C. S., 2008 "Tectonics of the West Antarctic Rift System: new light on the history and dynamics of distributed intracontinental extension." Antarctica: A Keystone in a Changing World: 91-114. DOI: 10.3133/of2007-1047.kp09
Siddoway, C.S., Baldwin, S.L., Fitzgerald, P.G., Fanning, C.M. and Luyendyk, B.P., 2004. Ross Sea mylonites and the timing of intracontinental extension within the West Antarctic rift system. Geology, 32 (1), pp. 57–60. DOI:10.1130/G20005.1
 Luyendyk, B.P., Wilson, D.S. and Siddoway, C.S., 2003. Eastern margin of the Ross Sea Rift in western Marie Byrd Land, Antarctica: Crustal structure and tectonic development. Geochemistry, Geophysics, Geosystems, 4(10). DOI:10.1029/2002GC000462
 Stone, J.O., Balco, G.A., Sugden, D.E., Caffee, M.W., Sass, L.C., Cowdery, S.G. and Siddoway, C., 2003. Holocene deglaciation of Marie Byrd land, west Antarctica. Science, 299 (5603), pp. 99–102. DOI:10.1126/science.1077998

References

External links
 Christine Siddoway's webpage
  Media coverage: Nature Careers
  Media coverage: ArsTechnica
  Media coverage: Colorado College
 

1961 births
Living people
American Antarctic scientists
Marie Byrd Land explorers and scientists
University of Arizona alumni
University of California, Santa Barbara alumni
American geologists
American women geologists
Women Antarctic scientists
Carleton College alumni
21st-century American women